Peduncle may refer to:

Peduncle (botany), a stalk supporting an inflorescence, which is the part of the shoot of seed plants where flowers are formed
Peduncle (anatomy), a stem, through which a mass of tissue is attached to a body
Peduncle (arthropods), the base segments of an antenna
Caudal peduncle, in fish, the narrow part of the body to which the tail attaches
Cerebral peduncle, a band of neurons, resembling a stalk, which connect varied parts of the brain
Cerebellar peduncle, one of six structures connecting the cerebellum to the brain stem
 In insect brains, the peduncle connects the lobes of the mushroom bodies to its calyx 
 In stalked barnacles, one of two external divisions of the body, a stalk attached to the substrate by cement glands
 In dinoflagellates an extendable stalk used to capture prey

See also
 Pedicle (disambiguation)